Abram M. Rothschild or A.M. Rothschild (1853 – July 28, 1902) was an American businessman who founded the A.M. Rothschild Company.

Biography
Abram M. Rothschild was born to a Jewish family in 1853 in Nordstetten (today a district of Horb am Neckar), Baden-Württemberg, Germany, the youngest child in a family of thirteen. In 1856, he immigrated to Davenport, Iowa where he joined his brother, Emmanuel, who had founded a retail store. The store was renamed to E. Rothschild and Bro. After the Great Chicago Fire, the brothers established a branch operation on the near west side of Chicago which soon morphed it into a clothing manufacturing operation. In 1881, they liquidated their retail operations and went solely into clothing manufacturing with their company, the Palace Clothing Company; Abram served as president and built production facilities in a number of cities. He served as a director of the Columbian Exposition and Vice President of the National Bank of the Republic. In 1895, he built a retail store under his name, A.M. Rothschild Company, with his father-in-law Nelson Morris and his brother-in-laws Edward Morris and Ira Nelson Morris as silent partners. It became one of the largest retail stores in Chicago.

Personal life
In 1882, he married Augusta Morris, daughter of Nelson Morris, the founder of the Chicago meatpacking company Morris & Company; they had one child, Melville Nelson Rothschild. Rothschild committed suicide by revolver on July 28, 1902, in Chicago. After his death, his wife married his cousin, Maurice L. Rothschild.

References

1853 births
1902 deaths
American retail chief executives
German emigrants to the United States
Morris family (meatpacking)
1902 suicides
19th-century American businesspeople
Suicides by firearm in Illinois